Wolfe may refer to:

Places

Canada
 Wolfe (provincial electoral district), a former electoral district in Quebec
 Wolfe Lake, Ontario
 Wolfe Island (Ontario), in Lake Ontario, Ontario
 Wolfe Island (Nova Scotia), in the Atlantic Ocean near Nova Scotia

United States
 Wolfe County, Kentucky
 Wolfe, West Virginia, an unincorporated community

People and fictional characters
 Wolfe (surname), a list of people and fictional characters
 Wolfe (given name), a list of people
 Runt Wolfe, nickname of Moe Berg, Major League Baseball player, and spy

Other uses
 , various Royal Navy ships
 Die Wölfe, a 2009 German miniseries
 Wolfe Laboratories, a research organization acquired by Pace Analytical in 2017
 Wolfe Video, the oldest and largest exclusive producer and distributor of LGBT films in North America
 Wolfe (TV series), a British television police procedural released in 2021

See also 
 Wolfe City, Texas, United States, a city
 Wolf
 Wolff
 Wolffe
 Woolfe